Kevin Loring (born November 24, 1974) is a Canadian playwright and actor. As a playwright, he won the Governor General's Award for English-language drama, the Herman Voaden Playwriting Competition and the Jessie Richardson Award for Outstanding Original Script, and was nominated for the Dora Mavor Moore Award for Outstanding New Play, for Where the Blood Mixes in 2009. His 2019 play, Thanks for Giving, was short-listed for the Governor General's Award for Drama. In June 2021 Kevin Loring received an honorary doctorate from the University of Ottawa's Faculty of Arts.

As an actor, his credits include roles in the television series Da Vinci's Inquest, Arctic Air and Health Nutz, and the film Pathfinder, as well as stage roles including Michel Tremblay's Saint Carmen of the Main, George Ryga's The Ecstasy of Rita Joe and Edmund in an all-First Nations production of William Shakespeare's King Lear at the National Arts Centre in 2012.

A Nlaka'pamux from the Lytton First Nation in British Columbia, he studied theatre at the prestigious Studio 58 theatre program at Langara College. In June 2017, Loring was selected by the Hnatyshyn Foundation as a recipient of the REVEAL Indigenous Arts Award, which honours Indigenous Canadian artists across disciplines. Kevin Loring created the Songs of the Land Project in collaboration with five separate organizations in his home community. This project aimed to bring traditional Nlakap’amux songs and stories, which were recorded on wax cylinders at the beginning of the 20th century by anthropologist James Teit, to contemporary audiences. This work informed The Battle of the Birds, a play which debuted at the Lytton River Festival in 2015, and which was restaged in Ottawa in 2019. It also spurred The Boy Who Was Abandoned, a second production which debuted in Lytton in September 2016.

On June 15, 2017, Loring was announced as the first artistic director for Indigenous Theatre at the National Arts Centre in Ottawa (NAC). In early 2019, the NAC was denied $3.5 million dollars of requested federal funding, a decision which would have a significant impact on the inaugural season. The first production, “The Unnatural and Accidental Women” by Métis playwright Marie Clements opened on September 11, 2019.

Works 

 Where the Blood Mixes (Talonbooks, 2009)
 Native Americans: A Visual Exploration [introduction only] (Annick Press, 2013), by Shaker Paleja
 Thanks for Giving (Talonbooks, 2019)

References

External links

1974 births
Living people
Canadian male television actors
Canadian male film actors
Canadian male voice actors
Canadian male stage actors
21st-century Canadian dramatists and playwrights
Male actors from British Columbia
Writers from British Columbia
Governor General's Award-winning dramatists
First Nations male actors
First Nations dramatists and playwrights
Nlaka'pamux people
People from the Thompson-Nicola Regional District
Canadian male dramatists and playwrights
Canadian theatre directors
21st-century Canadian male writers
21st-century First Nations writers
Langara College people